Luís Martín Arcón Díaz (born 1 June 1992), known as Luís Arcón, is a Venezuelan boxer. Arcón competed in the men's light welterweight event at the 2016 Summer Olympics. He won bronze medals in the same weight class at the 2015 Pan American Games and the 2014 Central American and Caribbean Games.

Professional boxing record

References

External links
 

1992 births
Living people
Venezuelan male boxers
Olympic boxers of Venezuela
Boxers at the 2016 Summer Olympics
Pan American Games bronze medalists for Venezuela
Pan American Games medalists in boxing
Boxers at the 2015 Pan American Games
People from Valle de la Pascua
Central American and Caribbean Games bronze medalists for Mexico
Competitors at the 2014 Central American and Caribbean Games
Boxers at the 2019 Pan American Games
Light-welterweight boxers
Central American and Caribbean Games medalists in boxing
Medalists at the 2015 Pan American Games
20th-century Venezuelan people
21st-century Venezuelan people